Ranger of the Big Pines is a 1925 American silent Western film directed by W.S. Van Dyke and starring Kenneth Harlan, Eugene Pallette and Helene Costello.

Cast
 Kenneth Harlan as Ross Cavanagh 
 Eugene Pallette
 Helene Costello as Virginia Weatherford 
 Eulalie Jensen as Lize Weatherford 
 Will Walling as Sam Gregg 
 Lew Harvey as Joe Gregg 
 Robert Graves as Redfield 
 Alan Hale
 Joan Standing

References

Bibliography
 Munden, Kenneth White. The American Film Institute Catalog of Motion Pictures Produced in the United States, Part 1. University of California Press, 1997.

External links
 

1925 films
1925 Western (genre) films
Films directed by W. S. Van Dyke
Vitagraph Studios films
American black-and-white films
Silent American Western (genre) films
1920s English-language films
1920s American films